The Men's 10,000 metres event at the 2007 World Championships in Athletics took place on 27 August 2007 at the Nagai Stadium in Osaka, Japan.

Medalists

Records
Prior to the competition, the following world and championship records were as follows.

Schedule

Results

References
Full results - IAAF.org

10000 metres
10,000 metres at the World Athletics Championships